Becky is a feminine given name, often a nickname for Rebecca. It may also refer to:

Arts and entertainment
 Becky (1927 film), an American silent comedy film
 Becky (2020 film), an American action thriller film
 "Becky" (song), a 2009 song by rapper Plies

Other uses
 Becky Falls, a waterfall in Dartmoor, England
 Becky (slang), slang for white woman
 Becky!, an email client
 Tropical Storm Becky (disambiguation)
 Becky's Diner, a diner in Portland, Maine

See also
 Rebecca